Antoine Girard, sieur de Saint-Amant (September 30, 1594December 29, 1661) was a French poet.

Saint-Amant was born near Rouen. His father was a merchant who had, according to his son's account, been a sailor and had commanded for 22 years "une escadre de la reine Elizabeth" – a vague statement that lacks confirmation. The son obtained a patent of nobility, and attached himself to different great noblemen – the duc de Retz and the comte d'Harcourt among others. He saw military service and sojourned at different times in Italy, in England – a sojourn which provoked from him a violent poetical attack on the country, Albion (1643) – in Poland, where he held a court appointment for two years, and elsewhere. Saint-Amant's later years were spent in France; and he died at Paris.

Saint-Amant has left a considerable body of poetry. His Albion and Rome ridicule set the fashion of the burlesque poem. In his later years he devoted himself to serious subjects and produced an epic, Moyse sauvé (1653). His other work consists of Bacchanalian songs, his Débauche being one of the most remarkable convivial poems of its kind.

References

 Oeuvres, edited by Jean Lagny, 4 volumes (1967–71). The standard critical edition.
 Robert T. Corum, Other Worlds and Other Seas (1979). Close formal analysis.
 Edwin M. Duval, Poesis and Poetic Tradition in the Early Works of Saint-Amant (1981). Intertextual synthesis.
 David Lee Rubin, "Le Mauvais Logement", Chapter 2 of The Knot of Artifice (1981).
 Catherine Ingold, "Order and Affinity in the Seasonal Sonnets of Saint-Amant" in The Ladder of High Designs: Structure and Interpretation of French Lyric Sequences, edited by Doranne Fenoaltea and David Lee Rubin (1991).

External links
 

French poets
Members of the Académie Française
1594 births
1661 deaths
17th-century French writers
17th-century French male writers
French male poets